Wola Sernicka  is a village in the administrative district of Gmina Serniki, within Lubartów County, Lublin Voivodeship, in eastern Poland.

References

Wola Sernicka